Ammobium alatum, commonly known as the winged everlasting, is a species of perennial herb in the daisy family Asteraceae and is both a native and an introduced species in south-eastern Australia. It has prominently winged stems, most of its leaves at the base, and heads of yellow florets surrounding by papery, white involucral bracts.

Description
Most of its leaves are at the base of the plant and are narrow egg-shaped to narrow triangular. There are a few sessile, bract-like leaves on the stems.

Taxonomy and naming
The genus Ammobium and Ammobium alatum were first described in 1824 Robert Brown in Curtis Botanical Magazine. The name Ammobium is from the Greek words, ammos ("sand") and bios (" life"), describing the genus as growing in sand, and the specific epithet alatum is from the Latin alatus meaning "winged" in reference to its winged stems.

Distribution and habitat
The winged everlasting often grows in disturbed environments such as on roadsides and agricultural land, and sometimes on riverbanks where the seeds have been carried from disturbed areas. Records of this species in natural habitats are from eucalypt forests in plateau and rocky cliffs in northern New South Wales, from river banks in the upper Snowy River in Victoria, from the Northern Tablelands and North West Slopes of New South Wales and from south-east Queensland. Robert Brown found it "growing plentifully near the shores of Port Hunter (or the Coal River) in New South Wales" in 1804. The species is naturalised in South Australia, The Australian Capital Territory and Tasmania, and in places outside its natural distribution in New South Wales.

References

Gnaphalieae
Asterales of Australia
Flora of New South Wales
Flora of Queensland
Flora of Tasmania
Flora of South Australia
Flora of Victoria (Australia)
Plants described in 1824
Taxa named by Robert Brown (botanist, born 1773)